College Bullodu is a 1992 Telugu-language comedy film directed by Sarath. It stars Akkineni Nageswara Rao, Raadhika, Harish and music composed by Raj–Koti. It is produced by P. Balaram under Sri Anupama Productions.

Plot
Gopala Krishna (Akkineni Nageswara Rao), an industrialist, holds a high esteem in the society. But unfortunately, he is  uneducated. Exploiting it, his opponent Koteswara Rao (Satyanarayana) always criticizes and looks him down. Simultaneously, his son Raja (Harish) becomes a vagabond in college, to keep up his honor and straighten his son, Gopala Krishna joins in the college at the age of 50. Rest of the story is how Gopala Krishna achieves his goal.

Cast

Akkineni Nageswara Rao as Gopala Krishna 
Raadhika as Saraswathi 
Harish as Raja
Satyanayana as Koteswara Rao 
Brahmanandam as Lecturer Paramanandam
Babu Mohan as Papayya
Raj Kumar as Kumar 
Ali as Babu
Tanikella Bharani as Bairaagi
Narra Venkateswara Rao as Chenchuramayya
Telephone Satyanarayana as Principal 
Bhimeswara Rao as Prakash Rao 
K.K.Sarma as Librarian Ganapathi 
Sarathi as Inspector 
Chidatala Appa Rao as  Appa Rao 
Dham as Priest 
Yamuna as Sobha 
Jeenath as Latha 
Athili Lakshmi as Saraswathi's mother 
Kalpana Rai as Sundari's aunt
Disco Shanti as item number
Y. Vijaya as Sundari

Crew
Art: Srinivasa Raju
Choreography: Saleem, Prameela, Kalla
Dialogues: Satyanand 
Lyrics: Veturi
Playback: S. P. Balasubrahmanyam, Chitra
Music: Raj–Koti
Story: B. Venkatrao
Screenplay: Bhamidipati Radhakrishna
Editing: Murali-Ramaiah
Cinematography: Y. Maheedhar
Producer: P. Balaram
Director: Sarath
Banner: Sri Anupama Productions
Release Date: 2 July 1992

Music 

Music was composed by Raj–Koti. Lyrics were written by Veturi. Music released on RAAGA Recording Company.

References

External links

Indian comedy films
Films directed by Sarath
Films scored by Raj–Koti
1992 comedy films
1992 films